Aahaa Ethanai Azhagu is a 2003 Tamil language romantic drama film directed by Kanmani The film starred Mithun, Charmy, Nassar, and Pyramid Natarajan. The film was produced by J S Pankaj Mehta. Aha Ethanai Azhagu also has Nassar, Ranjitha, Fathima Babu, Pyramid Natarajan, Devan, Dhamu, Karunas and Pallavi in the cast. Kanmani directs the film, where popular Kannada actress Bhavana also plays an important role. A. Venkatesh is the cameraman and Vidyasagar is the music director. Actress Charmy Kaur's final film in Tamil cinema, until 12 years later she made her comeback in 10 Endrathukulla (2015).

Cast
 Mithun as Chandru
 Charmy as Divya
 Bhavana as Sandhya
 Nassar as Rajasekar
 Pyramid Natarajan as Natarajan
 Devan as Ashok
 Ranjitha
 Fathima Babu
 Karunas as Shankar
 Vaiyapuri
 Dhamu
 Pallavi
 Madhan Bob
 Pandu
 M. S. Bhaskar
 Crane Manohar
 Abhinayashree

Soundtrack
Music was composed by Vidyasagar. He has introduced a Mumbai singer Sujatha Bhattacharya, better known as Madhushree.

Reception
Sify wrote "This is yet another stale love story, which is far from having logic or sense". Chennai Online wrote "It's a fairly average entertainer, but what is commendable is that the director does not waste much time in moving the story forward, by too many of those 'accidental encounter' type of scenes. He keeps the pace going, removing each hurdle as it crops up in the story, and moves to the climax briskly". The Hindu wrote "Little else can be said about a film that has neither major gaffes nor unforgettable highlights".

References

2003 films
2000s Tamil-language films
Films scored by Vidyasagar